Cecil Spooner (January 29, 1875 – May 13, 1953) was an American stage and film actress, screenwriter, and film director.

Biography
Cecil Spooner was born on January 29, 1875, in New York City. Her mother, Mary Gibbs Spooner, ran a theater in Brooklyn.

Spooner made her New York theater debut in 1903 in My Lady Peggy Goes to Town.  She continued to appear on Broadway throughout the decade.

Spooner married Charles E. Blaney, who had written several of the Broadway plays in which she appeared, in 1909. That same year, Spooner made her motion picture debut in the Edison Studios adaptation of Mark Twain's The Prince and the Pauper. Spooner played the roles of the prince, Edward, and the pauper, Tom Canty. She was praised by a reviewer for Moving Picture World for her ability to convey the distinctions between the two characters.

In 1914, Spooner wrote, directed, and starred in the silent film Nell of the Circus.

On December 9, 1914, Spooner was arrested at the Bronx theater that she managed for "indecency." The police and the local community had taken offense to the play Spooner had opened the night before, The House of Bondage, and its treatment of "white slavery," a euphemistic term for sex trafficking. Spooner was released into the custody of her lawyer; she revised the play twice to remove the "objectionable" content, but the show ran for only eight performances and was reviewed negatively by theater critics.

Spooner appeared in several films in the early 1920s, and she returned to Broadway in the late 1920s and early 30s. Her last known acting role was in a 1950 episode of the TV show The Lone Ranger.

Cecil Spooner died on May 13, 1953, in Sherman Oaks, California.

Selected filmography 

 One Law for the Woman (1924)
 The Love Bandit (1924)
 Peaceful Neighbors (1922)
 He's Bugs on Bugs (1922)
 Money or My Life (1922)
 The Decoy (1912) (A stage play written by Harry King Tuttle especially for her)
 Nell of the Circus (1914) (also writer and director)
 The Dancer and the King (1914)
 Hansel and Gretel (1909)
 The Prince and the Pauper (1909)

References 

1875 births
1953 deaths
Women film pioneers
American film directors
American women film directors
American women screenwriters
American film actresses
Actresses from New York City
20th-century American women writers
20th-century American screenwriters